Bishop Wilson Theological College was founded as a theological college in 1879 to train Anglican clergy to serve in the Church of England. It was named after Thomas Wilson, Bishop of Sodor and Man between 1697 and 1755, located in part of Bishopscourt and closed in 1943.

Notes

Educational institutions established in 1879
Educational institutions disestablished in 1943
Anglican seminaries and theological colleges
Educational organisations based in the Isle of Man
Alumni of Bishop Wilson Theological College
1879 establishments in the British Empire